Abdali Road is located in Multan, central city of Pakistan. It refers to the road extending from Ghanta Ghar to SP Chowk. It is regarded as the model road of the city and it is also a commercial hub of the city.

History
Ahmad Shah Abdali, leader of Afghanistan was born in Multan city. A monument and a mosque of his name stand on Abdali Road.

List of things on Abdali road
Restaurants and eating places
 Ramada Hotel
 Zanzibar
 Bundu Khan Restaurant
 Hotel Taj & Restaurant

Shopping malls
 Chenone Tower Shopping Mall
 United Mall
 Khan Center

Bank branches
 Muslim Commercial Bank
 Standard Chartered Bank
 Silk Bank
 JS Bank
 First Woman Bank
 Allied Bank
 Al-Falah Bank
 Al-Baraka Bank
 Faysal Bank

Others
 Air University temporary Campus in Khan Center
 Pakistan International Airline's Booking Office
 Multan Press club
 Iqbal Garden
 Medicare Hospital
 Cardiology Center
 Haveli Canal Circle Offices
 Land Reclamation Office
 Irrigation

See also
 Chowk Kumharanwala Level II Flyover, Multan
 Nusrat Road
 Bosan Road
 List of roads in Multan

References

External links
 Multan City government website 

Transport in Multan
Roads in Punjab, Pakistan
Multan-related lists